Karin Hackl (born 14 June 1989) is an Austrian former alpine skier winner of the Europa Cup overall title in 2009.

Career
In her career she has won two medals at youth level at the World Junior Alpine Skiing Championships 2009. She retired from alpine skiing in 2012 and from 2013 competed one year also in the FIS Freestyle Ski World Cup.

Europa Cup results
Hackl has won an overall Europa Cup and one specialty standings.

FIS Alpine Ski Europa Cup
Overall: 2009
Giant slalom: 2009

References

External links
 

1989 births
Living people
Austrian female alpine skiers
Austrian female freestyle skiers
21st-century Austrian women